Pectinivalva chalcitis is a moth of the family Nepticulidae. It is found along the south-western coast of Western Australia.

The wingspan is about 5.5 mm for females.

The larvae possibly feed on Eucalyptus. They probably mine the leaves of their host plant.

External links
Australian Faunal Directory
Australian Nepticulidae (Lepidoptera): Redescription of the named species

Moths of Australia
Nepticulidae
Moths described in 1906
Taxa named by Edward Meyrick